Marco Crocchianti (born 18 February 1996) is an Italian football player who plays for Ravenna.

Club career
He made his professional debut in the Serie B for Spezia on 2 April 2016 in a game against Cagliari.

On 18 November 2021 he joined Ravenna in Serie D.

References

External links
 

1996 births
People from Marino, Lazio
Footballers from Lazio
Living people
Italian footballers
Association football defenders
Spezia Calcio players
A.C. Reggiana 1919 players
F.C. Südtirol players
A.C.N. Siena 1904 players
Ravenna F.C. players
Serie B players
Serie C players
Serie D players
Sportspeople from the Metropolitan City of Rome Capital